Kumara Illangasinghe, (B.Sc., B.D., M.Litt) is a former Anglican Bishop of Ceylon. After his ordination in 1971, he served in parishes including Thalampitiya, Rathmeewela and Aragoda. After that, he was appointed as the chaplain of Trinity College, Kandy.

Illangasinghe was the principal of the Theological College of Lanka between 1992 and 1999. 
In 2000 he was consecrated as the fourth Bishop of Kurunegala, following the retirement of Bishop Andrew Kumarage.
 
He is married to Dr. Lakmini Illangasinghe.

See also
Church of Ceylon
Bishop of Kurunegala

References

External links
 The Church of Ceylon (Anglican Communion)
 Anglican Church of Ceylon News
 Period in Office as Bishop

20th-century Anglican bishops in Asia
Sri Lankan Anglican bishops
Sri Lankan educational theorists
Anglican bishops of Kurunegala
Living people
Year of birth missing (living people)